Woodland is an unincorporated community in Clearfield County, Pennsylvania, United States. Woodland has a post office with ZIP code 16881.

References

Unincorporated communities in Clearfield County, Pennsylvania
Unincorporated communities in Pennsylvania